Star Quest, also called Star Quest: The Regency Wars is an out-of-print collectible card game. It was published by Comic Images and was released in August 1995. The first set, titled The Regency Wars, had 325 cards. It featured art from Frank Frazetta, Luis Royo, and Ken Barr among others. An expansion called Origins was planned for a January 1996 release but never materialized.

Allen Varney of The Duelist said it was a "worse clone" of Magic: the Gathering.

References

External links
Preview in Scrye #8

Card games introduced in 1995
Collectible card games